Tumco Mine was a former gold mine in the Cargo Muchacho Mountains of Imperial County, California.

References

Gold mines in California